The American Civil Liberties Union of Colorado is a civil rights organization in the United States, and it is the Colorado affiliate of the American Civil Liberties Union.

History
The ACLU of Colorado has investigated ongoing instances of police brutality in the cities of Denver and Aurora among other cities.

The ACLU of Colorado has actively worked with the city of Aurora in their search for a new police chief in the wake of the death of Elijah McClain.

The ACLU of Colorado has worked to expand voter rights in the state.

The ACLU of Colorado sued Teller County for information sharing between the sheriff's department and ICE.

References

External links

American Civil Liberties Union
Non-profit organizations based in Colorado